Twarowski (feminine Twarowska) is a Polish surname. Notable people with the surname include:

 Aura Twarowska (born 1967), Romanian opera singer
 Jerzy Twarowski (born 1995), Polish swimmer
 Maciej Twarowski (born 2001), Polish footballer

See also
 Twardowski

Polish-language surnames